Ernst Selmer may refer to:

 Ernst Sejersted Selmer (1920–2006), Norwegian mathematician
 Ernst W. Selmer (1890–1971), Norwegian philologist and phonetician